Ogle Hall is an historic building in Annapolis, Maryland, Maryland Inventory of Historic Properties Inventory #AA-530.  It is also known as the United States Naval Academy Alumni House.

It is located at 247 King George Street and was built between 1739 and 1742 for Dr. William Stephenson.  It changed hands and in 1747, Daniel Cheston leased the property to Provincial Governor of Maryland, Samuel Ogle, giving the building its namesake.  Ogle maintained two properties in the Province, the other being the Belair Mansion in nearby Collington, Maryland.

Benjamin Ogle Tayloe was born on May 21, 1796, at Ogle Hall in Annapolis, Maryland, to Anne Ogle Tayloe, daughter to Benjamin Ogle and wife of John Tayloe III of The Octagon House in the Federal CIty of Washington, whose family seat resided on the Northern Neck of Virginia, the colonial estate built by his father-John Tayloe II-Mount Airy, Richmond County, Virginia.

Ogle Hall was recently bough and turned into an Airbnb rental.

References

Houses in Annapolis, Maryland